A korao no New Zealand; or, the New Zealander's first book was written by Anglican missionary Thomas Kendall in 1815, and is the first book written in the Māori language. The full title is A korao no New Zealand, or, The New Zealander's first book : being an attempt to compose some lessons for the instruction of the natives.

200 copies were printed in Sydney by missionary Samuel Marsden in 1815. The only known extant copy is held by Auckland War Memorial Museum.
In 2014, the book was added to the UNESCO Memory of the World Register.

References

External links
 Digital copy of the volume held at the Auckland War Memorial Museum.

Māori
Māori language
1815 in New Zealand
1815 non-fiction books
New Zealand books
Memory of the World Register